The La Guajira Desert (Wayuu: Woumainkat Wajiira) is a desert located in northern Colombia and Venezuela, approximately  north of Bogotá, covering most of the La Guajira Peninsula at the northernmost tip of South America. It is the continent's largest desert north of the equator. Most of the region is within Colombia's La Guajira Department, though a small portion is in the Venezuelan state of Zulia. The area holds immense coal reserves which are exploited in a zone known as El Cerrejón. It is also home to the indigenous Wayuu people. The Wayuu are mostly herders but also master deep-sea divers, known for collecting pearls from the Caribbean Sea.

The peninsula is populated chiefly by xeric scrubland, which is home to a large variety of flora and fauna. The National Natural Park of Macuira, established in 1977, is a tropical oasis located in the La Guajira Desert.

References

External links

Deserts of Colombia
Deserts of Venezuela
Geography of La Guajira Department